Maiwa is district of Enrekang Regency in South Sulawesi, Indonesia. It is divided into ten villages: Patondon Salu (population 2,017), Salo Dua (970), Boiya (882), Tuncung (1,266), Bangkala (3,902), Mangkawani (1,069), Botto Mallangga (2,127), Batu Mila (also known as Malino; population 1,426), Puncak Harapan (798), Tapong (833), Palakka (601), Pasang (809), Baringin (886), Lebani (836), Matajang (1,001), Limbuang (272), Ongko (733), Pariwang (460), Kaluppang (689), Paladang (884), Labuku (616) and Tanete (523).

References 

Districts of South Sulawesi